Athlone High School is a public, co-educational high school in Silvertown, Athlone, Cape Town, Western Cape, South Africa.

History
The school was founded in 1947 by the South African poet, author and educator, S. V. Petersen, who remained at the school for 28 years until his retirement in 1974.

Notable alumni
Patricia Goliath
Yusuf Karaan
Essa Moosa
Denise Newman
Dulcie September
Terence Goliath
Cris Sickle
Mervyn Goliath

References

Schools in Cape Town